Luca Stanga (born 23 January 2002) is an Italian professional footballer, who plays as a centre-back or a right-back for Serie C Group A club Lecco.

Club career
Born in Brescia, Stanga is a youth product of A.C. Milan, where he started playing football at the age of six, before coming through all their youth ranks and finally beginning training with the senior team in 2021. He made his professional debut with the club on 9 January 2022, coming in as a substitute in the final minutes of a 3–0 Serie A win over Venezia F.C.

On 1 August 2022, Stanga joined Serie C club Lecco on a permanent deal, signing a contract until 30 June 2024.

International career 
Although he has never represented Italy in an official international match, Stanga took part in a training camp with the Under-19 team in January 2021.

References

External links
 

2002 births
Living people
Footballers from Brescia
Italian footballers
Italian people of Romanian descent
A.C. Milan players
Serie A players
Association football fullbacks